Mordellistena crunneocephala is a beetle in the genus Mordellistena of the family Mordellidae. It was described in 1917 by  Pic.

References

crunneocephala
Beetles described in 1917